Be Mine Tonight was the debut single from New Zealand band Th' Dudes. It was released in May 1979 as a Double A-side with Walking in Light and reached No. 36 on the New Zealand music charts. Be Mine Tonight won Single of the Year at the 1979 New Zealand Music Awards. It was voted 27th best New Zealand Song of the 20th Century by APRA members and featured on the Nature's Best CD.

References

External links
 Music Video (NZOnScreen)

1979 singles
APRA Award winners
Th' Dudes songs
Songs written by Dave Dobbyn